Alfred Billson may refer to:
 Alfred Billson (British politician)
 Alfred Billson (Australian politician)